Shalom Rav ("Abundant Peace") is a blessing that is recited at the end of the evening and afternoon Amidot in the Ashkenazic tradition. In Provence tradition, it was recited in all prayers. There is a different version of this prayer, Sim Shalom (שִׂים שָׁלוֹם), for the morning Amidah; Sim Shalom is also recited by all Ashkenazim at mincha of fast days, and in the Western Ashkenazic rite (as well as most communities in Israel) and Mincha on the Sabbath. In the Sefardic, Nusach Sefard, Nusach Ari, Italian Nusach and Romaniote rites, Sim Shalom is said at all prayer services.

Versions in Song 

In the denominations of Judaism where many prayers are sung rather than chanted, the most popular melody for Shalom Rav is the one composed by Jeff Klepper and Dan Freelander in 1974. It is a regular part of Shabbat services in Reform congregations around the world.

In many Jewish congregations, the cantor and congregation will sing the version of Shalom Rav by Ben Steinberg.  The sheet music can be found in the Reform movement's "Shaarei Shira" Gates of Song book, at least in the 1987 edition.

Text

References 

Per Rosenberg, Rabbi Arnold. JEWISH LITURGY AS A SPIRITUAL SYSTEM, (Northvale, NJ: Jason Aronson, 1997), page 99
The "Shalom Rav" prayer originated in 11th century Germany.

Rosenberg's source = 
Elbogen, Ismar. Jewish Liturgy: A Comprehensive History, Translated by Raymond P. Scheindlin, (New York: The Jewish Publication Society, 1993), p. 53

Ashkenazi Jewish culture
Jewish blessings